The Thirteen Buddhist Sites of Yamagata（山形十三仏霊場, Yamagata jūsan butsu reijō）are a group of 13 Buddhist sacred sites in Yamagata Prefecture, Japan. The temples are dedicated to the Thirteen Buddhas.

Directory

See also
 Thirteen Buddhas

External links
 Japanese language listing

Buddhist temples in Yamagata Prefecture
Buddhist pilgrimage sites in Japan